The Edmonton Open was a golf tournament on the Canadian Tour that was held in Edmonton, Alberta, Canada. It was founded in 1993 as the Klondike Golf Klassic and was held during the week leading up to the Klondike Days summer fair. In 1996 Telus become the tournament's main sponsor and it was re-titled as the ED TEL PLAnet Open, before becoming the Telus Edmonton Open the following year.

The Edmonton Open came to an end after the 2009 edition when it was merged with the ATB Financial Classic, which was played in Edmonton in 2010 and 2012. Edmonton's PGA Tour Canada event since 2016 is the 1932byBateman Open (previously known as the Syncrude Oil Country Championship).

Winners

References

Former PGA Tour Canada events
Golf tournaments in Alberta
Recurring sporting events established in 1993
Recurring sporting events disestablished in 2009